Ataxia stehliki is a species of beetle in the family Cerambycidae. It was described by Chemsak in 1966. It is known from Cuba.

References

Ataxia (beetle)
Beetles described in 1966
Endemic fauna of Cuba